Peccatum was an avant-garde metal band from Norway. Their influences range from black metal, progressive metal, industrial music, symphonic metal and gothic metal to European classical music and contemporary music.

History

Peccatum was formed by singer Ihriel (Heidi Solberg Tveitan), her husband Ihsahn (of the well-known black metal band Emperor), and her brother Lord PZ. The group released three albums and two EPs. Lost in Reverie, released in 2004 after Lord PZ's departure, moved towards a more classical, avant-garde and musically opaque direction.

Lost in Reverie and the 2005 EP The Moribund People were both produced under the label Mnemosyne Productions, owned and operated by Ihriel and Ihsahn themselves.

On March 4, 2006 Peccatum split, leaving room for Ihriel to continue with Starofash and Ihsahn to work on his solo project.

Discography

Studio releases

Strangling from Within – (1999)
Oh, My Regrets (EP) – (2000)
Amor Fati – (2000)
Lost in Reverie – (2004)
The Moribund People (EP) – (2005)

References

 "Peccatum" on Encyclopedia Metallum

External links
Mnemosyne Productions

Norwegian avant-garde metal musical groups
Musical groups established in 1998
1998 establishments in Norway
Musical groups disestablished in 2006
2006 disestablishments in Norway

Musical groups from Norway with local place of origin missing